UAAP Season 75 was the 2012–2013 athletic year of the University Athletic Association of the Philippines. The season's theme was "Unbreakable at 75" in relation to the league's diamond year. It was hosted by National University.

The men's basketball and the women's volleyball tournaments have been aired by ABS-CBN Channel 2 and Studio 23, the former for the thirteenth consecutive year and the latter since Season 69.

This season, the men's football and women's softball both became a seven-school tournament. National University made a comeback in these two events. NU was participating in these two events in the 1940s up to the 1950s. NU also fielded for the first time men's and women's teams in Taekwondo to also make these events a seven-school tournament. As seven-school tournaments, men's football and women's softball will now include the Final 4 in its format.

Opening ceremony
The opening ceremony was held on July 14, 2012 at the Mall of Asia Arena in Pasay, Metro Manila.

Basketball

The UAAP Season 75 basketball tournament began on July 14, 2012 at the Mall of Asia Arena, Pasay, Metro Manila. The tournament host was National University and tournament commissioner was Edmundo "Ato" Badolato.

The main venue of the basketball tournaments of season 75 was the newly constructed Mall of Asia Arena, which hosted at least 16 of 28 elimination round playing dates. The Smart Araneta Coliseum served as an alternate venue. PhilSports Arena also served as an alternative venue when the Mall of Asia Arena and Smart Araneta Coliseum were both unavailable. Games of the men's basketball tournament began after the opening ceremony.

Seniors division

Men's tournament

Elimination round

Playoffs

Awards
 Most Valuable Player: 
 Rookie of the Year:

Women's tournament

Elimination round

Playoffs

Awards
 Most Valuable Player: 
 Rookie of the Year:

Juniors division

Boys' tournament

Elimination round

Playoffs

Awards
 Most Valuable Player: 
 Rookie of the Year:

Volleyball

Seniors division

Men's tournament

Elimination round

Playoffs

Awards
 Most Valuable Player:  and 
 Rookie of the Year:

Women's tournament

Elimination round

Playoffs

Awards
 Most Valuable Player: 
 Rookie of the Year:

Juniors division

Boys' tournament

Elimination round

Awards
 Most Valuable Player: 
 Rookie of the Year:

Girls' tournament

Elimination round

Awards
 Most Valuable Player: 
 Rookie of the Year:

Beach Volleyball
The UAAP Season 75 beach volleyball tournament began on August 25, 2012 at the sand courts of UE Caloocan.

Men's tournament

Elimination round

Team standings

Match-up results

Awards
 Most Valuable Player: 
 Rookie of the Year:

Women's tournament

Elimination round

Team standings

Match-up results

Awards
 Most Valuable Player: 
 Rookie of the Year:

Football
The UAAP Season 75 football tournament began on December 2, 2012 at the football fields of the Ateneo de Manila University in Katipunan Avenue, Loyola Heights, Quezon City. Tournament host is Ateneo de Manila University.

Men's tournament

Elimination round

Team standings

Match-up results

Playoffs

Awards
 Most Valuable Player: 
 Rookie of the Year:

Women's tournament

Elimination round

Team standings

Match-up results

Awards
 Most Valuable Player: 
 Rookie of the Year:

Boys' tournament

Elimination round

Team standings

Match-up results

Awards
 Most Valuable Player: 
 Rookie of the Year:

Baseball
The UAAP Season 75 baseball tournament began on January 6, 2013 at the baseball diamond of the Rizal Memorial Baseball Stadium.

Men's tournament

Elimination round

Team standings

Match-ups results

Awards
 Most Valuable Players: 
 Rookie of the Year:

Juniors' tournament

Elimination round

Team standings

Match-up results

Awards
 Most Valuable Player: 
 Rookie of the Year:

Softball
The UAAP Season 75 softball tournament began on December 5, 2012 at the baseball diamond of the Rizal Memorial Sports Complex in Malate, Manila.

Women's tournament

Elimination round

Team standings

Match-up results

Playoffs

Awards
 Most Valuable Player: 
 Rookie of the Year:

Badminton
The UAAP Season 75 badminton tournament began on August 11, 2012 at Badminton Hall, Rizal Memorial Sports Complex.

Men's tournament

Elimination round

Team standings

Playoffs

Awards
 Most Valuable Player: 
 Rookie of the Year:

Women's tournament

Elimination round

Team standings

Awards
 Most Valuable Player: 
 Rookie of the Year:

Swimming
The UAAP Season 75 swimming tournament was held on September 27–30, 2012 at the Trace Aquatics Centre in Los Baños, Laguna. Four titles were disputed: the men's division, women's division, boys' division, and girls' division.

Team ranking is determined by a point system, similar to that of the overall championship. The points given are based on the swimmer's/team's finish in the finals of an event, which include only the top eight finishers from the preliminaries. The gold medalist(s) receive 15 points, silver gets 12, bronze has 10. The following points: 8, 6, 4, 2 and 1 are given to the rest of the participating swimmers/teams according to their order of finish.

Seniors division

Men's tournament

Final team standings

Awards
 Most Valuable Player: 
 Rookie of the Year:

Women's tournament

Final team standings

Awards
 Most Valuable Player: 
 Rookie of the Year:

Juniors division

Boys' tournament

Final team standings

Awards
 Most Valuable Player: 
 Rookie of the Year:

Girls' tournament

Final team standings

Awards
 Most Valuable Player: 
 Rookie of the Year:

Exhibition events

Cheerdance
The UAAP Cheerdance Competition was held on September 22, 2012 at the SM Mall of Asia Arena. The event was shown live on TV by Studio 23. Cheer dance competition is an exhibition event. Points for the general championship are not awarded to the participants.

 Score Sheet

Ranking Frequency is used in declaring the winners.

Host team in boldface. "Order" refers to order of performance.
 Stunner awardee:

Street dance 
The 3rd UAAP Street Dance Competition was held during the awarding and closing ceremonies for this season's UAAP. Street dance competition is an exhibition event. Points for the general championship are not awarded to the participants.

Host team in boldface.

General championship summary 
The general champion is determined by a point system. The system gives 15 points to the champion team of a UAAP event, 12 to the runner-up, and 10 to the third placer. The following points: 8, 6, 4, 2 and 1 are given to the rest of the participating teams according to their order of finish.

Medals table

Seniors' division

Juniors' division

General championship tally

Seniors' division

Juniors' division

Individual awards
 Athlete of the Year:
 Seniors (Men): 
 Seniors (Women): 
 Juniors:

See also
NCAA Season 88

References

External links
UAAPSports.TV (Official ABS-CBN website of the UAAP)

 
2012 in Philippine sport
75
2013 in Philippine sport